Raise My Kids is a New Zealand reality show wherein participants are put in charge of the children of a relative or family member for five days.

External links
 Raise My Kids on the TVNZ website

New Zealand reality television series
TVNZ 2 original programming
Television series by Greenstone TV